{{DISPLAYTITLE:C20H22O6}}
The molecular formula C20H22O6 (molar mass: 358.38 g/mol, exact mass: 358.1416 u) may refer to: 

 Matairesinol, a lignan
 Miroestrol, a phytoestrogen
 Pinoresinol, a lignan